Big Eddie is an American television sitcom that aired on CBS from August 23 until November 7, 1975. Its first three episodes, in a Saturday night time slot, did well in the ratings, but after it was moved to Friday nights, it had little success opposite Sanford and Son.

Premise
Big Eddie Smith, a reformed mobster tries to go legit as the owner of the Big E Sports Arena in New York City. Smith's family included his wife Honey, granddaughter Ginger, and brother Jessie.

Cast
Sheldon Leonard as Big Eddie Smith
Sheree North as Honey Smith 
Quinn Cummings as Ginger Smith
Billy Sands as Bang Bang Valentine
Alan Oppenheimer as Jesse Smith 
Ralph Wilcox as Raymond
Lonnie Shorr as Too Late
Milton Parsons as The Goniff
Fezwick DaPoochie as Lil’ Jackie Niblick
Cliff Pellow as No Marbles

Episodes

References

External links

1975 American television series debuts
1975 American television series endings
1970s American sitcoms
English-language television shows
CBS original programming
Television shows set in New York City